Tony Trew (also known as Anthony Andrew Trew) (Cape Town, 6 July 1941) is a South African politician and discourse analyst. He was one of the editors of the seminal book Language and control (1979), which helped establish critical linguistics as an academic field.

He obtained a BA in Political Theory from the University of Witwatersrand in 1962. His overt political compromise against apartheid led to his being imprisoned from 1964 to 1965 for collaboration with noted activist Edward Joseph Daniels; at his release he left the country for the United Kingdom, where he continued his studies at the University of Oxford. In 1970 he was appointed a lecturer at the University of East Anglia, where he taught logic, history of science and discourse analysis. He left the university in 1980 to hold a post as Director of Research at the International Defence and Aid Fund for Southern Africa, where he would remain until 1991; in this position he coordinated research on South Africa, as well as monitoring tasks in collaboration with political dissenters and NGOs.

He returned to South Africa in 1991 to work as senior researcher for the African National Congress, and in 1993 he was selected as research coordinator for the Elections Commission of the ANC. A year later he was transferred to the Office of the President as Director of Communications Research, a post he held until 1999. From 2002 he is Deputy CEO at the office of Strategy and Content Management.

He was portrayed by Trevor Sellers in the BBC film Endgame.

References

1941 births
Linguists from South Africa
Academics of the University of East Anglia
Living people
Discourse analysts